Novy Chirkey is a rural locality (a selo) in Kizilyurtovsky District, Republic of Dagestan, Russia. The population was 5,922 as of 2010. There are 67 streets.

Geography 
Novy Chirkey is located 20 km southeast of Kizilyurt (the district's administrative centre) by road. Kulzeb and Khachta are the nearest rural localities.

Nationalities 
Avars live there.

References 

Rural localities in Kizilyurtovsky District